Annexin A8-like protein 2 is a protein that in humans is encoded by the ANXA8L2 gene.

This gene encodes a member of the annexin family of evolutionarily conserved Ca2+ and phospholipid binding proteins. The encoded protein may function as an anticoagulant that indirectly inhibits the thromboplastin-specific complex. Overexpression of this gene has been associated with acute myelocytic leukemia. A highly similar duplicated copy of this gene is found in close proximity on the long arm of chromosome 10.

References

External links

Further reading